Jos Charles (born November 14, 1988) is a trans American poet, writer, translator, and editor. In 2017 her book feeld was a winner in the prestigious National Poetry Series. She is the founding editor of THEM, the first trans literary journal in the United States.

Biography 
Charles grew up in a conservative Evangelical Christian family, and wrote her first poem, about the Crucifixion, when she was seven years old. She received a Masters in Fine Arts degree from the University of Arizona. and is a PhD candidate in English at the University of California Irvine.

Charles's debut poetry collection, Safe Space was published in 2016 by Ahsahta Press. Her poetry has been published by POETRY, PEN, Washington Square Review, Denver Quarterly, GLAAD, and LAMBDA Literary''', The Feminist Wire, Action Yes, BLOOM, and The Capilano Review. In 2015 she received the Monique Wittig Writer's Scholarship. In 2016 Charles received a Ruth Lilly & Dorothy Sargent Rosenberg Fellowship through the Poetry Foundation and was a finalist for the Lambda Literary Award for Transgender Poetry.

Her second book, feeld, uses an original vocabulary that combines Middle English and textspeak. Chosen for the National Poetry Series by the poet Fady Joudah, it has been praised for its groundbreaking twist on classic pastoral traditions.

In June 2019, to mark the 50th anniversary of the Stonewall riots, an event widely considered a watershed moment in the modern LGBTQ rights movement, Queerty named her one of the Pride50'' "trailblazing individuals who actively ensure society remains moving towards equality, acceptance and dignity for all queer people".

Selected works

Books
Safe Space (Asahta Press, 2016)
feeld (Milkweed Editions, 2018)
a Year & other poems (Milkweed Editions, 2022)

Additional resources

jos charles at the Poetry Foundation
jos charles professional website
recording of jos charles talking about Geoffrey Chaucer

References 

Living people
21st-century American poets
1988 births
American magazine editors
American women poets
American LGBT poets
University of Arizona alumni
American women editors
Transgender women
21st-century American women writers
American transgender writers